Jalen Schlachter (born October 11, 1992) is an American football guard. He played college football for the Ball State Cardinals. O-Line coach at Corunna High School where he owns the shot put record with 64 ft.

High school career
A native of Corunna, Michigan, Schlachter attended Corunna High School where he was ranked No. 32 on the Detroit Free Press Michigan Top 50 list. Schlachter also competed in Basketball and Track and Field.
Regarded as a three-star recruit by Rivals.com, he was ranked as the No. 2 offensive guard prospect in their Michigan Postseason Top 30 2011.

College career
As a redshirt freshman, Schlachter appeared in 13 games for the Ball State Cardinals, playing both guard positions. His first career start came as a Redshirt Sophomore against Illinois State. In his sophomore year, Schlachter played another 12 games.
In his junior season, Schlachter started all 12 games as part of an offensive line that blocked for Ball State all-time leading rusher Jahwan Edwards, an offensive line that ranked in the nation's top-20 in fewest sacks allowed and fewest tackles for loss allowed. As a Senior in 2015 Schlachter was part of an offensive line that was top 5 in sacks allowed and tackles for loss.

Professional career
Jalen Schlachter's NFL Pro Day at Ball State was Thursday March 24, 2016.

References

External links
 Jalen Schlachter on Youtube

1992 births
Living people
American football offensive guards
Ball State Cardinals football players
People from Corunna, Michigan